Driessenia is a genus of flowering plants belonging to the family Melastomataceae.

Its native range is Western and Central Malesia.

The genus name is in honour of Peter van Driessen (1753–1828), Dutch doctor, pharmacist, chemist and botanist.

Species:

Driessenia aequiappendiculata 
Driessenia attenuata 
Driessenia axantha 
Driessenia ciliata 
Driessenia dispar 
Driessenia ferox 
Driessenia glanduligera 
Driessenia grandithyrsa 
Driessenia hepaticoides 
Driessenia inaequalifolia 
Driessenia kemoelensis 
Driessenia microthrix 
Driessenia minutiflora 
Driessenia ohwiana 
Driessenia phasmolacuna 
Driessenia planopetiolata 
Driessenia sessiliflora 
Driessenia teysmannii 
Driessenia winkleri

References

Melastomataceae
Melastomataceae genera